Navdeep Singh may refer to:
Navdeep Singh (Ashok Chakra) (died 2011), Indian soldier who posthumously received the Ashok Chakra
Navdeep Singh (cricketer) (born 1974), Indian cricketer and umpire
Navdeep Singh (director) (born 1968), Indian director
Navdeep Singh (lawyer), Indian lawyer, reserve army officer, and author
Navdeep Singh (tennis) (born 1986), Indian tennis player
Navdeep Singh (athlete) (born 2000), Indian Paralympian and javelin thrower